Thomas Velin (born 14 April 1975) is a Danish equestrian. He competed at the 2000 Summer Olympics and the 2004 Summer Olympics.

References

External links
 

1975 births
Living people
Danish male equestrians
Olympic equestrians of Denmark
Equestrians at the 2000 Summer Olympics
Equestrians at the 2004 Summer Olympics
Place of birth missing (living people)